The 1998–99 Australian Athletics Championships was the 77th edition of the national championship in outdoor track and field for Australia. It was held from 18–20 February 1999 at the Olympic Park Stadium in Melbourne. It served as a selection meeting for Australia at the 1999 World Championships in Athletics. The 10,000 metres event took place separately at the Zatopek 10K on 5 December 1998 at Lakeside Stadium in Melbourne. The combined events were also held separately at the Hobart Grand Prix on 25–26 February 1999.

Medal summary

Men

Women

References

External links 
 Athletics Australia website

1999
Australian Athletics Championships
Australian Championships
Athletics Championships
Sports competitions in Melbourne
1990s in Melbourne